Krausirpi (also spelt Krausirpe) is a village in Honduras. The village is located in the municipality of Wampusirpi. Krausirpi is the centre of the Tawahka people. The village is located at bank of the Patuca River. Wampusirpi is the nearest market town, located 30 kilometers away. The village can only be reached by boat.

Name
Krausirpi is a hybrid name. 'Krau' means 'island' in Tawahka language, whilst 'sirpi' means 'small' in Miskito language.

History
Krausirpi was founded in 1938 by the Tawahka chief Claudio Cardona. The original name of the village was Kaununhi. At the time, the Tawahka people had been uprooted from their traditional centre, Yapuwas, by disease and forced displacement by the Tiburcio Carias government and some of them settled down in the new village.

Around the time of the Honduran-Nicaraguan border conflict of 1958–1959, the government of Honduras founded a school in Krausirpi.

Another wave of migration from Yapuwas to Krausirpi took place in the early 1960s, as a number of Ladinos (escaping from law enforcement) had reached Yapuwas. In 1967 Moravian missionaries sent pastors to Krausirpi and built a church there.

In 1989, the National Agrarian Institute issued a guarantee of protected lands for the Tawahkas, extending some 7,500 hectares in the surroundings of Krausirpi. In 1992, a Health Sub-Centre was built in the village. In the same year, the first attempt to launch Krausirpi as an eco-tourism destination was launched.

Demographics
According to one estimate, as of 1995, the village had 58 households and 479 inhabitants. At the time, about half of the Tawahka people lived in the village. Another estimate stated that some 930 people lived in Krausirpi as of 1997, gathering the overwhelming majority of the Tawahka people in Honduras. According to a third estimate, some 100 Miskito people and 4 Ladinos lived in the village as of 1995. In a census for a study conducted in 2009, there were 115 houses, 218 families and 1056 people living in the community.

Krausirpi is divided into two distinct areas, one purely Tawahka settlement and an area inhabited by Miskito people. The village hosts one Catholic church.

Politics
The Tawahka Indigenous Federation of Honduras (FITH) is based in Krausirpi. Apart from FITH, there is also an Auxiliary Mayor (appointed by the municipal mayor), some NGO presence, parents' society, Health Committee and Teachers' Association.

Krausirpi, with its surroundings, is one of three electoral sectors in Wampusirpi municipality. In the 2009 presidential election Elvin Santos obtained 152 votes in the sector, Porfirio Lobo 124 votes, Cesar Ham 9 votes, Felicito Avila 3 votes and Bernard Martinez 3 votes.

Economy
Around half of the inhabitants in the village work as artisans. The Tawahka grow rice, yuca, beans and corn for their own consumption.

Cacao is grown in the area. Cacao farming began in the 1980s, as hybrid seedlings were distributed by a non-governmental organization. Community leaders have sought to promote eco-tourism in the area, but with little success.

References

Populated places in Honduras
Gracias a Dios Department